Christian Freedom International (CFI) is an international human rights organization that "helps those who are persecuted for their faith in Jesus Christ." It is based in Front Royal, Virginia.  

Christian Freedom International aids, equips, and advocates for persecuted Christians.  It provides spiritual and material support, such as Bibles and Bible training, food and medical aid, schools and training, churches and shelters, and runs programs such as child sponsorships and microenterprise.

Christian Freedom International runs micro-enterprises to provide incomes for Christian refugees. "Freedom Fighters" is a T-shirt-of-the-month club that provides jobs and training for Christian refugees and produces a new t-shirt design every month. A Center for the Blind and Disabled in Bangladesh is stocked with sewing machines and candle-making tools for Christians with disabilities to make items to sell.

The Freedom Inn in Sault Ste Marie, Michigan, was established as affordable housing for Karen (Burma) Christian refugees in the U.S. The renovated motel was remodeled into apartments, and the pool transformed into a garden. Freedom Inn became a base for community volunteers to help refugees to assimilate and become U.S. citizens. 

Christian Freedom International is a 501(c)(3) nonprofit organization and relies on voluntary, private support from individual donors and churches throughout the United States.

Christian Freedom International originated from the Swiss-based organization Christian Solidarity International and established official independence as Christian Freedom International on April 24, 1998.  James Jacobson, a former policy analyst in the Reagan administration, was president from 1998 to 2017. In 2017, Wendy Wright, a human rights and religious freedom advocate, became president.

Christian Freedom International is a member of the Evangelical Council for Financial Accountability (ECFA).

Humanitarian Assistance
Christian Freedom International operates programs that provide relief aid, education, Bible and skill training to Christians who are discriminated against because of their religious beliefs.  Since its founding, the organization has worked in countries such as Burma(Myanmar), Bangladesh, Pakistan, Iraq, Egypt, North Korea, Sri Lanka, Thailand, Sudan, India, Indonesia, Afghanistan, Iran, China, Vietnam, Nepal, Tibet, and Laos.

CFI's international programs include:

 Victory Bible Academy, a Bible and vocational school in Mae Sot, Thailand for Christian refugees from Burma.
 A school for Pakistani Christian refugee children in Bangkok whose families are seeking asylum.
 Bibles (print and audio) for Christians in restrictive countries where it is illegal or especially difficult to obtain or own a personal copy of the Scriptures;
 Emergency food and aid distribution to impoverished, displaced or refugee Christians;
 Medical assistance through the establishment of clinics, donations of medicine and medical supplies, and the support of field medics who provide medicine and medical treatment for internally displaced persons and refugees;
 Aid packs for needy Christian families in debt bondage in Pakistan;
 Pastor support and training;
 Aid, Bible training and opportunities to make an income for disabled Christians in Bangladesh.
 Child sponsorship, especially for orphans, for basic, daily essentials as well as educational needs and supplies;
 Micro-enterprise programs to provide an income for Christians, who produce handcraft products for sale online.
 CCTV security cameras/systems/training for churches threatened by extremists.

More up to date information about CFI's programs is available on their website https://christianfreedom.org/.

Advocacy
Christian Freedom International works to increase understanding and awareness of the worldwide persecution of Christians, how Christians live under persecution, and how people can help. CFI mobilizes Christians to pray and advocate for victims of persecution and designs materials for churches to participate in the International Day of Prayer for the Persecuted Church.

One of CFI's largest advocacy campaigns involved the 2006 decision by the U.S. State Department to allow the resettlement of persecuted refugees from Burma into the United States.  After months of political indecision and a final waiver of restrictions under the Immigration Nationality Act, the State Department approved the applications of thousands of refugees that were seeking asylum in the United States.

Financial Accountability
Christian Freedom International is a member of the Evangelical Council for Financial Accountability (ECFA).  According to ECFA's 2005 year-end data, 85.9% of CFI's revenues were used for program expenses, 9.9% for administrative expenses, and 4.2% for fund-raising expenses.  Additional information about CFI's accountability practices, including a Financial Report and IRS Form 990, https://christianfreedom.org/

References

External links
 Christian Freedom International

Organizations established in 1998
Human rights organizations based in the United States